The 2003 AP Tourism Hyderabad Open was the first edition of the WTA tournament held in Hyderabad, Andhra Pradesh, India organized for women's professional tennis. It was held from 3 February until 9 February 2003 on outdoor hardcourts. Tamarine Tanasugarn won the singles title.

Finals

Singles

  Tamarine Tanasugarn defeated  Iroda Tulyaganova 6–4, 6–4

Doubles

  Elena Likhovtseva /  Iroda Tulyaganova defeated  Eugenia Kulikovskaya /  Tatiana Poutchek 6–4, 6–4

WTA entrants

Seeds

 Rankings as of 25 January 2003.

Other entrants
The following players received wildcards into the main draw:
  Elena Likhovtseva
  Sania Mirza

The following players received entry from the qualifying draw:
  Yuliya Beygelzimer
  Maria Kirilenko
  Manisha Malhotra
  Zheng Jie

The following players received entry through the lucky loser spot:
  Sun Tiantian

References 

2003 WTA Tour
Bangalore Open
2003 in Indian tennis